Marek Harloff (born 22 April 1971) is a German actor. He appeared in more than seventy films since 1984.

Selected filmography

References

External links 

1971 births
Living people
German male film actors